Ethel Jewett  (September 8, 1877 – December 8, 1944) was an American silent film actress.

Biography
Jewett was born in Portland, Oregon in 1877. She was educated in Portland and San Francisco, California. In late 1901, she joined a stage company headed by  Don Daly, and appeared in Philadelphia at the Garrick Theatre with Daly's troupe in a stage production of The New Yorkers in December that year. She also worked as a model, and later appeared in productions in New York City at the Weber Music Hall in 1906.

She would go on to appear in multiple silent films beginning in 1910, working for American Biograph, Gaumont, Famous Players, and Thanhouser. Her career in film earned her notable popularity, as she was the runner up to Clara Kimball Young in a December 1915 popularity contest sponsored by the New York Sunday Telegraph. She was awarded an Overland automobile in the contest. Jewett relocated to New York City in 1916, living on 207th street in the Bronx for several years.

She appeared in films such as The Land Beyond the Sunset (1912), L'article 47 (1913), The Undertow (1915) and Fairy Fern Seed (1915). She worked for a period with the Edison Stock Company.

Jewett died in Los Angeles, California in 1944.

Filmography

References

External links

1877 births
1944 deaths
American silent film actresses
American stage actresses
Actresses from Portland, Oregon
20th-century American actresses